Mohamed Guèye (born 25 November 1983) is a Senegalese table tennis player. He competed in the men's singles event at the 2004 Summer Olympics.

References

1983 births
Living people
Senegalese male table tennis players
Olympic table tennis players of Senegal
Table tennis players at the 2004 Summer Olympics
Place of birth missing (living people)